The Cham festivals of the Champa region in the Vietnam portion of southeast Asia 
include agricultural festivals, religious festivals, dancing festivals, chancel festivals and tower festivals. All these are part of their ethnic and cultural heritage.

Agriculture festivals
 
 
 
 
 
 
 
 
 : Fire God worshiping festival
 
 
 : Buffalo worshiping festival

Cham New Year

Chancel festivals

Dancing festivals

Harvest festival

Religious festivals

Tower festivals
 : tower gate opening festival
 
 : Homeland Female God worshiping festival

References

Cham